Isaac Agyenim Boateng (born 25 May 1996) is a Ghanaian professional footballer who plays as forward for Ghana Premier League side Medeama S.C. He is a product of the Kumasi Asante Kotoko youth team.

Club career

Early career 
Agyenim Boateng started his career with Kumasi Asante Kotoko. He played in the youth team before moving to Medeama SC in 2017. He was part of the club's youth set-up that played against Libyan giants Ahly Tripoli in an international friendly in January 2017.

Medeama SC 
On transfer deadline day, 15 May 2017, Boateng signed for Tarkwa-based side Medeama SC on a permanent deal for a free transfer. On 4 June 2017, he made his professional debut, coming on as 73rd minute substitute for Kwasi Donsu in a 2–0 loss to Elmina Sharks. He ended the 2017 Ghana Premier League season with 7 league matches and 1 goal.

During the 2018 Ghana Premier League season, he made 11 league appearances and scored 1 goal before the league was abandoned due to the dissolution of the Ghana Football Association (GFA) in June 2018, as a result of the Anas Number 12 Expose.

In the 2019–20 Ghana Premier League season, he played in 13 league matches out of 15 and scored a goal before the league was cancelled as a result of the COVID-19 pandemic.

On 29 December 2020, during the opening match of the 2019–20 season Medeama recorded a comfortable 3–1 win on the road against Ebusua Dwarfs in Cape Coast. Boateng provided the assist for all three goals, earning him the nickname "Assist King". On 9 January 2021, he scored a brace in a 2–1 victory over Aduana Stars, to earn Medeama their first home victory of the season.

References

External links 

 

1996 births
Living people
Association football forwards
Ghanaian footballers
Medeama SC players
Ghana Premier League players